The Weakest Link is a British television quiz show, mainly broadcast on BBC Two and BBC One. It was devised by Fintan Coyle and Cathy Dunning and developed for television by the BBC Entertainment Department. The game begins with a team of nine contestants (eight in the revival), who take turns answering general knowledge questions within a time limit to create chains of nine correct answers in a row. At the end of each round, the players then vote one contestant, "the weakest link", out of the game. After two players are left, they play in a head-to-head penalty shootout format, with five questions asked to each contestant in turn, to determine the winner.

History

The first original episode was broadcast on 14 August 2000. The show was presented by Anne Robinson and narrated by Jon Briggs. It ran in different variations, originally as a daytime series but also at primetime and with celebrity contestants playing for charity with a modified set and format. The format has since been produced around the world, most notably in the United States, where Robinson was the original presenter.

On 22 April 2011, Anne Robinson announced that she would end her role as the quiz show's presenter by the time her contract would expire as she had served longer than she had originally intended. The original run ended on 31 March 2012 with its 1,693rd, and final episode.

In November 2017, Weakest Link returned for a celebrity Children in Need edition, marking the 1,694th episode of the programme. The 40-minute edition aired on 17 November 2017 on BBC Two at 10pm GMT.

In June 2021, a 12-episode primetime revival with celebrity contestants and Romesh Ranganathan as host was announced. The revival premiered on BBC One on 18 December 2021. In March 2022, the revival was renewed for a second series, which premiered on 17 December 2022. In February 2023, the revival was renewed for a third series.

Format
The original format features nine contestants, who take turns answering general knowledge questions. The objective of every round is to create a chain of nine correct answers in a row and earn an increasing amount of money within a time limit. One wrong answer breaks the chain and loses any money earned within that particular chain. However, before their question is asked, a contestant can choose to bank the current amount of money earned in any chain to make it safe, after which the chain starts afresh. A contestant's decision not to bank, in anticipation of being able to correctly answer the upcoming question allows the money to grow, as each successive correct answer earns proportionally more money.

When the allotted time for every round ends, any money which is not banked is lost, and if the host is in the middle of asking a question, or has asked a question but the contestant has yet to answer, the question is abandoned. If the question is completed, the host gives the correct answer whether the contestant is able to answer the question correctly or not. The round automatically ends if the team successfully reaches the maximum amount for the round before the allotted time expires, and the next person says "Bank", or (in the revival) says "bank" and presses a button on their podium. Round 1 starts with 3 minutes on the clock (2 minutes and 30 seconds on the revival), every round thereafter (except round 8) is reduced by 10 seconds as players are eliminated. For Round 8, the last or final round, the remaining 2 players only have 90 seconds (1:30) to triple whatever they bank.

In the original series, the first person to be asked a question in the first round was the player whose name was first alphabetically. In the revival, it is a randomly chosen player. Every subsequent round starts with the "strongest link"—the player with the most correct answers from the previous round, unless that person has been voted off, in which case the second strongest link answers first.

Seven timed rounds are played in the 2021 revival, with question values and target totals increasing every two rounds. The final round is played for double value. The target begins at £2,500 in the first round and increases to £10,000 in the seventh (the real target of which is £20,000), allowing for a potential maximum bank of £50,000.

Money chains
Question and target values during the daytime and primetime runs of the series are displayed in the table below.

Voting and elimination
At the end of every round, contestants must vote one player out of the game. Until the beginning of the next round, only the television audience knows exactly who the strongest and weakest links are statistically due to Briggs' narration. While the contestants work as a team when answering questions, they are at this point encouraged to be ruthless with one another. Players often decide to vote off weaker rivals, but occasionally decide to eliminate stronger players as well, in hope that it then improves their chances of winning the game. After the revealing of the votes, the host will interrogate the players on their choice of voting, the reasons behind their choice, as well as their performance, background and their interests. After interrogation, the player with the most votes is given a stern "You are the weakest link. Goodbye!" or "With [#] votes, you are the weakest link. Goodbye!" and must walk off the stage in what is called the "Walk of Shame." The eliminated contestant then delivers a brief confessional, summing up the experience of the show and occasionally taunting the team for voting them off, as well as providing opinion as to who is voted off next, and who is likely to win.

In the event of a tie or draw, the strongest link has the final decision about who is eliminated. If he or she voted for a tied player, there is the option of sticking with their vote or changing it. Strongest links usually stick with their original choice, unless another player in the tie has voted for them. Occasionally, the strongest link has voted for someone who is not in the tie, and so is forced to make a decision one way or the other.

Final round
The last two contestants work together in the eighth and final round identical to the previous ones, however, all money banked at the end of this round is tripled and added to the current money total, forming the final total for the game. At the end of this round, there is no elimination, with the game instead moving to the head-to-head round.

"Head to head" round
For the head-to-head round, the remaining 2 players are each required to answer 5 questions each in a penalty shootout format. The strongest link from the previous round chooses who goes first. Whoever has the most correct answers at the end of the round wins the game. In the event of a tie, the game goes to Sudden Death. Every player continues to be asked questions as usual, until 1 person answers a question correctly and the other incorrectly.

The winner of the game is declared "the strongest link" and takes home all of the money accumulated in the prize pool for the game, and the loser leaves with nothing, like all previous eliminated players. In daytime episodes, the maximum possible winnings are £10,000; in primetime and special celebrity charity episodes, the maximum is £50,000.

Special editions

Prime-Time versions
After the huge success of the show in its early evening slot on BBC Two, a separate prime-time version was added to BBC One, usually broadcast on Wednesday evenings. These versions of the show were produced on a larger budget than the daytime version, with the additions of higher jackpots, electronic podiums, and a studio audience.

The first primetime version of the show was Weakest Link: Champions League, which shared the same rules as the daytime version, but instead featured eight previous winners, who battled it off once again for £20,000 (with a money tree of £50-£100-£200-£500-£1,000-£1,500-£2,000-£2,500; with the 7th round being a double round for £5,000). 

The Champions format was not successful, and by the following year the format was replaced with one similar to that of the daytime series but retaining the eight players and doubled jackpot. A few months later, the contestants were cut down to seven, as well as the time from 45 min to 30, and the prize money remained the same. (with a money tree of £50-£100-£250-£1,000-£1,750-£2,500; the 6th round being a triple round for £7,500). This was changed once again to include nine podiums used on the daytime series, and the potential prize money was raised to £50,000, and with this, the time was increased to an hour-long show. After a while, the prime-time series transitioned from using regular contestants to celebrities playing for charity.

Although Briggs and Robinson state that 8 players will leave with nothing, normally the losing celebrities receive a "house" amount to give to their chosen charity, as well as their own fee for appearing on the show. In some celebrity editions, two celebrities have represented one position in the game, with the two conferring before giving their answer. There have also been several editions featuring entirely celebrity couples. A Christmas edition of the programme was also aired in some years. Some contestants, such as Christopher Biggins, Peter Duncan and Basil Brush, have appeared several times.

These editions tended to have a theme in relation to what celebrities were featured, such as a puppet edition where a Robinson puppet introduced the show.

Daytime editions
The daytime version has also seen its share of variance, as was the case in 2 particular episodes.

An April Fools' Day show that aired in 2003 featured Robinson being strangely and uncharacteristically nice to the contestants and abandoning her traditional black wardrobe in favour of a metallic pink overcoat. The nice nature of the episode even extended to the normally stoic narrator being much more excited and optimistic in his narration. However, Anne did not remain kind to the contestants for the entire episode, resuming her old behaviour after declaring the winner and contestants as "so stupid".

Another variant of the daytime show was the 1,000th episode, which aired in December 2006, with the contestants featured being fan-favourites from previous editions (mostly from the prime-time series). Much like the prime-time version, a studio audience was added, although gameplay rules remained the same, with the potential prize money remaining at £10,000. The show's first winner, David Bloomfield was one of the returning contestants, and was asked the question: If there have been 1,000 episodes of The Weakest Link, each with 9 players, how many contestants in total have appeared on the show? He answered the question correctly (9,000) but banked prior to it being asked. He did not win any money on the 1,000th episode and was voted off in only the 3rd round, despite having been the strongest link in the first two rounds. In the end, Miss Evans (who had previously appeared on the Strong Women special but had lost out to curate Emma Langley) defeated Basil Brush, winning £2,710, which she split with her co-finalist to give to charity. Robinson then announced that a bonus of £1,000 would be added to the final total, as it was the 1,000th episode, resulting in a final total of £3,710, or both contestants receiving £1,855 each. It also marked the first time that Anne Robinson did not say the phrase "...you leave with nothing." to the losing contestant.

The final daytime episode (2012)
The 1,693rd episode was titled "You are The Weakest Link - Goodbye" and aired on BBC One on 31 March 2012. Filming for the final original edition took place on 11 December 2011. The ending of the show was the only special part to the last edition.

A normal daytime edition of the show was made, with some of Anne's favourite contestants from over the years taking part, and with no audience present during filming or changes to the money tree (see above). The first round of questions was notably different and was mainly about Weakest Link and the host, Anne Robinson. The last question asked was "If the Roman numeral 'X' is halved, the result can be represented by which other Roman numeral?", the answer being "V". The last UK winner was Archie Bland, the editor of The Independent newspaper's Saturday edition, who won £2,090.

A short montage of clips from the show was shown at the end of the game. After saying goodbye, all of the lights turned off with Anne being the only person left in the studio. The programme was eventually replaced by the Alexander Armstrong-fronted Pointless as the big BBC teatime quiz (it had aired on BBC Two for some years previously).

Success
Much of the show's success has been attributed to its host, Anne Robinson. She was already famous in the UK for her sarcasm while presenting Points of View and the consumer programme Watchdog, and Weakest Link saw her develop this further, particularly in her taunting of contestants. Her sardonic summary to the team, usually berating them for their lack of intelligence for not achieving the target became a trademark of the show, and her call of "You are the weakest link—goodbye!" became a popular catchphrase.

The presence of elements inspired by Survivor and Who Wants to Be a Millionaire? differentiated the programme from most previous quiz shows, as it invites open conflict between players, and uses a host who is openly hostile to the competitors, rather than a positive figure.

In autumn 2001, for the first time, Weakest Link was placed directly head-to-head with Millionaire in the television schedules. Between the two, Millionaire ultimately emerged on top, attracting 10.2m viewers compared to Weakest Link'''s 3.8m. Additionally, later in that autumn, due to the show's ever-rising popularity, a videogame based on the show was released for the PlayStation, PlayStation 2 and Microsoft Windows platforms.

From 9 to 13 August 2010, five "10th Anniversary Specials" aired at the usual time on BBC One.

Transmissions

Daytime

Primetime

International versions

The format has been licensed across the world, with many countries producing their own series of the programme and is the second most popular international franchise, behind only the Who Wants to Be a Millionaire? franchise, which also originated in the UK.

Strategy for banking money
In a New Scientist blog article, Erica Klarreich argues that there are only two sensible strategies in Weakest Link (the U.S. edition) when it comes to banking money. Either players should choose to bank after every correct answer, or after six straight correct answers to maximize the pot. The correct strategy to take will depend upon the team members' skill at answering questions. For all but the weakest teams, the optimal strategy is to raise the pot six straight times without banking. But since this happens so seldom on the show, Klarreich argues, the dominant strategy will usually be instead to bank after every question. The common practice of banking after just three questions would only outperform the strategy of banking after every question if a team maintained a success rate of over 67%.

Cultural references
Anne Robinson's catchphrase "You are the weakest link. Goodbye!" has made several appearances in pop culture, including references in Family Guy, Scary Movie 2, How I Met Your Mother, and The League of Gentlemen.

The comedy series That Mitchell and Webb Look broadcast a sketch based on Weakest Link called Hole in the Ring, featuring Robert Webb as an overly harsh presenter who makes mistakes whilst reading questions.

Two fictional television shows, Doctor Who and My Family, have depicted their own versions of Weakest Link in their episodes. The Doctor Who edition, broadcast in 2005, showed a futuristic version of the show in the year 200,100, with only six contestants, and presented by an 'Anne Droid' (voiced by Anne Robinson). A later special edition of Weakest Link featured nine cast members of Doctor Who playing the game, and the show was introduced by the Anne Droid. The real Anne walked on stage almost instantly as the droid began the show, unplugged it, and said, "I don't think so. I think we'll do that again." She then began the show herself and proceeded as normal.

In the seventh series of the British television show My Family'', broadcast in 2007, the main characters Ben, Susan, Janey, Michael, Abi, Roger, and Alfie, along with Susan's mother and her husband, went on the show for a special family edition, after Michael forged all of their signatures to get on it. The real Anne Robinson was the host.

See also
List of television show franchises

References

External links

BBC television game shows
UK
2000 British television series debuts
2000s British game shows
2010s British game shows
2020s British game shows
BBC high definition shows
Television series by BBC Studios
Television series produced at Pinewood Studios
BBC Scotland television shows
English-language television shows
British television series revived after cancellation